Derek Stark (born 13 April 1966 in Kilmarnock) is a Scottish former international rugby union player who played for Glasgow Warriors at the Wing positions

Rugby Union career

Amateur career

Stark grew up in Kilmarnock playing rugby with Kilmarnock RFC and working in his parents hotel there, The Foxbar Hotel.

As a teenager he moved south to England to study a catering course in Woking at the Tante Marie Culinary Academy. While he was there he played amateur rugby for Guildford & Godalming RFC and Chobham RFC.

After a sojourn into athletics, on seeing the top Caribbean athletes run slightly quicker, Stark moved back into rugby playing for Boroughmuir RFC.

Stark played for Ayr RFC

He went on to play for amateur side Glasgow Hawks.

Stark played for Melrose RFC He played half a game for Melrose; one of the ten club sides that he played for.

Stark again played for Boroughmuir RFC. and won the BT Cellnet Cup with them in 2001.

Provincial and professional career

He represented Glasgow District at U21 as well as 7s.

Stark was again picked for Glasgow District when back at Ayr RFC.

He was part of Glasgow District's famous 1989-90 side which went unbeaten all season, winning that year's Scottish Inter-District Championship outright.

On the amateur provincial Glasgow District's move into professionalism in 1996 as Glasgow Rugby - now Glasgow Warriors - Stark signed a professional contract with the Glasgow side. The move came at a time when Stark was considering a move to play for West Hartlepool RFC.

As the Wing named for Warriors first match as a professional team - against Newbridge in the European Challenge Cup - Stark has the distinction of being given Glasgow Warrior No. 14 for the provincial side.

International career

Stark played for Scotland U21, Scotland Club XV, Scotland B, Scotland A and Scotland as well as Scotland 7s.

He notably scored a try on his international Scotland debut in 1993.

Athletics career

From rugby union, Stark tried his hand at being a sprinter, He could run  in 10.6 seconds.

Business career

For a short period, Stark - along with international teammates Rowen Shepherd and Gregor Townsend - owned a bar in Edinburgh's Grassmarket area. The bar was aptly named The Three Quarters.
Alongside track star Brian Whittle he was a co-director at PB events.

References

External links
 ESPN Profile

1966 births
Living people
Scottish rugby union players
Scotland international rugby union players
Ayr RFC players
Boroughmuir RFC players
Glasgow Hawks players
Glasgow District (rugby union) players
Glasgow Warriors players
Melrose RFC players
Kilmarnock RFC players
Scotland international rugby sevens players
Scotland 'A' international rugby union players
Male rugby sevens players
Scotland Club XV international rugby union players
Scotland 'B' international rugby union players
Rugby union players from Kilmarnock